p53 apoptosis effector related to PMP-22 is a plasma membrane protein that, in humans, is encoded by the PERP gene.

PERP is a direct transcriptional target of p53, but its transcription can also be regulated by other transcription factors.

PERP is important for skin development, and loss of PERP is associated with the development and progression of several types of human cancers.

References

Further reading